was a town located in Awa District, Chiba Prefecture, Japan.

As of March 20, 2006, the town had an estimated population of 5,698 and a density of 221 persons per km². The total area was 25.69 km².

Geography
Tomiura was located at the southwest end of Chiba Prefecture, facing the entrance to Tokyo Bay on the Pacific Ocean. The town had a temperate maritime climate with hot, humid summers and mild, cool winters.

History
Tomiura Village was created on April 1, 1889 within Hei District, which became part of Awa District from April 1, 1897. Tomiura became a town on April 11, 1933. On March 31, 1955, Tomiura absorbed the neighboring village of Yatsuka.

On March 20, 2006, Tomiura, along with the towns of Chikura, Maruyama, Shirahama, Tomiyama and Wada, and the village of Miyoshi (all from Awa District), was merged to create the city of Minamibōsō.

Economy
The economy of Tomiua was largely based on commercial fishing, horticulture (primarily loquats, and summer tourism.

Transportation

Highway
Japan National Route 127

Railway
JR East – Uchibō Line

External links
Minamibōsō official website 

Dissolved municipalities of Chiba Prefecture
Minamibōsō